The Laredo Juarez–Lincoln Port of Entry is an international port of entry inspection station on the Mexico–United States border between Laredo, Texas and Nuevo Laredo, Tamaulipas. Sometimes referred to as Bridge II, it is located at the  Juarez-Lincoln International Bridge.

The station was built in 1976, primarily to divert truck traffic from the congested Gateway to the Americas International Bridge.  However, it too was soon overwhelmed with traffic.  Currently, all trucks are inspected at Bridges III and IV, leaving only passenger vehicles and buses crossing at this location.

References

See also

 List of Mexico–United States border crossings
 List of Canada–United States border crossings

Mexico–United States border crossings
1976 establishments in Texas
Buildings and structures completed in 1976
Buildings and structures in Laredo, Texas